La Biche River Wildland Provincial Park is a wildland provincial park in northern Alberta, Canada. The park is included in the Upper Athabasca Region Land Use Framework.

Location
It is west of Alberta Highway 63 between Township Road 685 in the south and Amesbury in the north. The La Biche River forms the eastern boundary of the park. The river then takes a sharp left turn and forms the northern boundary. The Athabasca River forms the western boundary. The southern boundary is Pine Creek. Other borders are completed by the Dominion Land Survey system. There is no road access to the park. Poachers Landing PRA is adjacent to La Biche WPP on the west. Once inside Poachers Landing, trails for off highway vehicles, snowmobiles, and horseback riding allow access to the Wildland Provincial Park. The PRA also allows access to the Athabasca River which connects to the park in summer and winter.

Ecology 
The park protects an example of the Central Mixedwood subregion of the Boreal Forest natural region of Alberta. In the National Ecological Framework for Canada used by Environment and Climate Change Canada, the park is in the Athabasca Plain ecodistrict of the Boreal Transition ecoregion in the Central Boreal Plains ecoprovince of the Boreal Plains Ecozone. Under the OneEarth classification (previously World Wildlife Fund), the park is in the Mid-Canada Boreal Plains Forests ecoregion of the Mid-Canada Boreal Plains & Foothill Forests bioregion.

Geography 

The park is largely flat except for the valley where it meets the Athabasca.

Climate 
The Köppen climate classification of the park is Continental, Subarctic (Dfc) characterized by long, cold winters, and short, warm to cool summers.

Natural history themes 
The low ridges are covered by dense forests while the land between the ridges is covered in marsh. The park protects an undisturbed boreal forest of aspen, birch, black poplar, fir, and black spruce. Carnivores found in the park include American black bear and lynx. Ungulates in the park include moose, wolverine, and woodland caribou. Beavers are found in the marsh.

Activities 
The park has a significant trail system allowing off-highway vehicle and horseback riding in summer and snowmobiling and dogsledding in winter but only on existing trails; off-trail use is prohibited. There are backcountry campgrounds on the western side of the park. On the waterways, Powerboating, canoeing, and kayaking are permitted. Wildlife viewing and backcountry hiking are allowed. Hunting and fishing are permitted when licensed.

See also 
 List of provincial parks in Alberta
 List of Canadian provincial parks

References

External links 
 

Parks in Alberta
Provincial parks of Alberta